The Ultra-Violence is the debut studio album by American thrash metal band Death Angel, released in 1987. The album was recorded while all members were under 20, with drummer Andy Galeon just 14 years old. It was mixed at George Tobin Studios in Hollywood, California.

The title could be a reference to Stanley Kubrick's movie A Clockwork Orange.

Reception and legacy 

The Ultra-Violence is considered a classic in the thrash metal genre, listed as number 370 in the 2010 reference book, The Top 500 Heavy Metal Albums of All Time. Adam McCann of Metal Digest wrote, "Punching their way out of the trenches of the Bay Area and following in the footsteps of the likes of Testament and Exodus, Death Angel delivered a beast of an album with many Death Angel fans still saying that The Ultra-Violence is their favourite album. The then snot-nosed kids showed how amazingly talented they were as they suddenly found themselves going toe to toe with their older peers and being able to come out on top with excellent songs and electrifying live performances."

Track listing 

Mark Osegueda claimed in a 2003 interview that "I.P.F.S." stood for "Intense Puke Feeling Syndrome", but it is unclear if this was meant to be taken seriously.

Personnel 
Death Angel
Mark Osegueda – lead vocals
Rob Cavestany – lead guitar, backing vocals
Gus Pepa – rhythm guitar
Dennis Pepa – bass, backing vocals, lead vocals (track 1)
Andy Galeon – drums

Additional musicians
Arnie Tan – percussion

Production
Davy Vain – production
Dennis Hulett – engineering
Warren Dennis – engineering
Robert Feist – engineering
Rob Cavestany – mixing
Andy Galeon – mixing

References 

Death Angel albums
1987 debut albums
Enigma Records albums